Dančo Masev (born 16 December 1983) is a Macedonian retired footballer.

Club career
He plays in midfield and he played for Anagennisi Karditsa F.C., FK Belasica, FC Metalurh Zaporizhzhia in Ukraine, FK Rad in Serbia and with FK Rabotnički and FK Vardar in Macedonia.

International career
He made his debut for the Macedonian national team on 20 November 2002 in a friendly match against Israel, and has earned a total of 5 caps, scoring no goals. His final international was a November 2005 friendly match against Liechtenstein.

References

External links

1983 births
Living people
Sportspeople from Strumica
Association football midfielders
Macedonian footballers
North Macedonia international footballers
FK Belasica players
FK Rad players
FK Vardar players
FC Metalurh Zaporizhzhia players
FK Rabotnički players
FK Horizont Turnovo players
Anagennisi Karditsa F.C. players
Macedonian First Football League players
Ukrainian Premier League players
Super League Greece 2 players
Macedonian Second Football League players
Macedonian expatriate footballers
Expatriate footballers in Serbia and Montenegro
Expatriate footballers in Ukraine
Expatriate footballers in Greece
Macedonian expatriate sportspeople in Serbia and Montenegro
Macedonian expatriate sportspeople in Ukraine
Macedonian expatriate sportspeople in Greece